Air Vice Marshal Clive Arthur Bairsto   is a former Royal Air Force officer and former Air Officer Scotland.

RAF career
Bairsto became Station Commander RAF Akrotiri and Commander of the Western Sovereign Base Area, Cyprus in 2005, AOC No. 83 Expeditionary Air Group at Al Udeid Air Base, Qatar in 2006 and Officer Commanding No 125 Expeditionary Air Wing as well as Air Officer Scotland and Station Commander, RAF Leuchars in 2007. He went on to be Head of International Policy and Planning (Military) at the Ministry of Defence in 2009 before retiring in 2013.

After retiring from the RAF, became Global Head of Business, Resilience at National Grid plc and then Chief Executive of Street Works UK, a cross-sector trade association.

Bairsto was appointed Commander of the Order of the British Empire (CBE) in the 2010 New Year Honours.

References

|-

|-

|-

|-

Royal Air Force officers
Living people
Commanders of the Order of the British Empire
Year of birth missing (living people)